The Senate of Pakistan consists of a total of 100 members. The 1970 assembly framed the 1973 Constitution which was passed on 12 April and promulgated on 14 August 1973. The 1973 Constitution provides for a parliamentary form of government with a bicameral legislature, composed of the National Assembly and the Senate. The membership of the Senate, which was originally 45, was raised to 63 in 1977 and to 87 in 1985. The government of Gen. Pervez Musharraf raised the membership of the Senate from 87 to 100 in 2002. In 2018, the number of seats were reduced from 104 to 96 following the merging of FATA with Khyber Pakhtunkhwa through 25th amendment.

Current party position in Senate
The current party position in Senate is as follows:

List of current senators

References

External links 
 Official Website of the Senate of Pakistan
 List of Current Senators of Pakistan

Senators of Pakistan
Members of the Senate of Pakistan